Akorede Babatunde Okunola  (born 7 August 1969) also known by stage name Saheed Osupa or King Saheed Osupa (K.S.O) is a Nigerian Fuji musician, film actor, and Hip Fuji Creator.

Early life
Saheed Osupa was born in the Mosafejo area of Ajegunle, Lagos State but grew up as a child in Ibadan, the capital of Oyo State. His father, Moshood Ajiwere Layeye was a Wéré music artist and also an elder cousin of Fuji musician Ayinde Barrister.

Education
Saheed Osupa went to Amuwo Odofin High School in Lagos, where he graduated in 1987. In 1992, he completed his National Diploma programme at The Polytechnic, Ibadan after studying Business Administration. He is an alumnus of the American International College where he studied Networking Operations.

Career

Fuji Music
Saheed Osupa started music professionally as a teenager in 1983 as a fuji artiste. His first album was titled Fuji Fa Disco, Followed by Fuji Blues. He has released over 40 studio albums including a 4-in-1 studio album titled Mr. Music. In 2008, Saheed Osupa was declared the "King of Fuji Music" by Ayinde Barrister.

Hip hop music
Saheed Osupa is the HIP FUJI Creator, On 12 June 2018 he released his first hip Fuji Album titled: Non-Stop. On 20 December 2014, Saheed Osupa released a hip hop single titled "Vanakula" produced by K-Solo. On 13 April 2015, he released another K-Solo-produced single titled "African Beauty" with vocals from Yetunde Omobadan. On 8 August 2015, he featured Seriki in another single titled "Womi".

On 7 November 2015, Saheed Osupa was listed in The NET'''s "Most Successful Nigerian musicians".

Acting
Saheed Osupa has appeared in over 30 Yoruba films.

Rivalry with Wasiu Alabi Pasuma
Saheed Osupa and Wasiu Alabi Pasuma have had several rivalry. Most notable were their fight for success in 1998/1999 and for supremacy around 2007. Osupa whom believed his good friend Pasuma would side him in feuds with other Fuji musicians most especially Alhaji Wasiu Ayinde. Pasuma however took the side of K1 D ultimate and was adopted as K1's deputy. Saheed Osupa released about 10 records addressing these feuds and they were all successful. He took all his contemporaries to cleaner and he was someway accorded the winner and King Of Music(Fuji).

He subsequently released the first ever 4-in-1 album in 2007/2008 named Mr Music. This album sold over 20 million copies worldwide. It is referred to as one of his most successful albums and the most successful Fuji albums in the 20th century.

He went on to winning several awards and honors. The feud continued into later 2012. Saheed Osupa claimed that several fruitless peace meetings took place in 2010 and 2011.

Discography

Selected singles

Studio albumsFuji FadiscoFuji BluesFuji DemonstrationMaster BlasterStainless FujiFuji BoggieUnbeatableShuffle SoloOvationScoresHot ShotAdviceNew Edition (Shuffle Solo 11)AuthenticBig DaddyChampionLondon Delight under Marvin Giwa PromotionAfrican DelightAmerican Fuji SlideWorld TourLondon ExtraRespect and Reliable - 2 in 1Fuji Icon Endorsement - 3 in 1Mr. Music - 4 in 1 Marriage AffairBarrybrationEuro SplashTime FactorImpactTurn By TurnThe Main ManCapabilityTested and Trusted - 2 in 1GuaranteedLord of Music - 2 in 1Transparency and Transformation - 2 in 1
 New Dawn - 2 in 1 
 New resolutionPacesetter 2017Non Stop 2018

 Dynamism (Monday 13 August 2018)C Caution 2019
 Integrity (07/08/2019)
 Permutation (23 December 2019)
 Special request-2 nd 1(05/07/2020)
 Eni Olohun  (2020)
 Permutation(2020)
 Special Request (2020)
 What Next (2020)
 Diary (2021)
 Direction(2021)
 Power of Music (2022)
 Fuji Template (2022)

Selected filmographyEni EleniEro Sese KooweEse Mefa LayeOse MaamiAshiru EjireOnibara OgunjoIku ObaIgba IwaseAgbeere OjuAlukoro''
"Aroba(Fable)"
Osoro baba ojo
Oloju ede
Adigun olori odo 
Onimoto 

Olokiki Oru 1,2 & 3

Awards and nominations

References

External links

1967 births
Musicians from Ibadan
Male actors from Ibadan
Yoruba male actors
Yoruba musicians
20th-century Nigerian musicians
American International College alumni
21st-century Nigerian musicians
Male actors in Yoruba cinema
Yoruba-language singers
Nigerian male film actors
Living people
Nigerian male musicians
The Polytechnic, Ibadan alumni
Nigerian songwriters
Nigerian film award winners